Luino–Milan railway is a railway line in Lombardy, Italy. It uses the tracks of the Milan–Arona railway until Gallarate.

The railway line was opened on 17 March 1884, to provide, together with the Luino–Oleggio railway, a second access to the Gotthard railway.

Notes

See also 
 List of railway lines in Italy

External links 

RFI - Fascicolo linea 24

Railway lines in Lombardy
Railway lines opened in 1884